Camou may refer to:

Geographic names
Aïcirits-Camou-Suhast, a commune in the Pyrénées-Atlantiques department in France.
Camou-Cihigue, a commune in the Pyrénées-Atlantiques department in France.
Family names
Jacques Camou (1792 – 1868), French general.
Richard Camou, French  politician (MPF), 2008–2014 mayor of Villeneuve-Loubet, France.
Other
Château Camou, Mexican Vineyard and Winery based in Cañada del Trigo.
the short term for Camouflage.